Domaszowice  is a village in Namysłów County, Opole Voivodeship, in south-western Poland. It is the seat of the gmina (administrative district) called Gmina Domaszowice.

The village has a population of 1,100.

References

Domaszowice